Sobasina coriacea is a species of jumping spider.

Name
coriacea "leathery" refers to the presence of a dorsal abdominal scutum in the male.

Distribution
Sobasina coriacea is only known from the Palau group of the Caroline Islands.

References
  (1998): Salticidae of the Pacific Islands. III.  Distribution of Seven Genera, with Description of Nineteen New Species and Two New Genera. Journal of Arachnology  26(2): 149-189. PDF

Salticidae
Endemic fauna of Palau
Spiders of Oceania
Spiders described in 1998